Webster Township is a township in lMadison County, Iowa, United States.

History
Webster Township was established in 1878.

References

Townships in Polk County, Iowa
Townships in Iowa
1878 establishments in Iowa
Populated places established in 1878